Alsagers Bank is a village in the Borough of Newcastle-under-Lyme in Staffordshire. Population details at the 2011 census can be found under Audley Rural. It has a pub, The Gresley Arms, St John's Church (Church of England), a primary school, and a football club. 
There is a regular bus service through the village between Newcastle-under-Lyme and Audley.

The village bears no relationship to Alsager in Cheshire and its name is a derivation from the Alsager family who lived in the area.

References

External links

Villages in Staffordshire
Borough of Newcastle-under-Lyme